Bruce Baker may refer to:

 Bruce Baker (ice hockey) (born 1956), Canadian ice hockey right winger
 Bruce Baker (footballer) (born 1950), Australian rules footballer
 Bruce Baker (geneticist) (1945–2018), American geneticist